Apriona marcusiana is a species of beetle in the family Cerambycidae. It was described by Kriesche in 1919. It is known from Malaysia, Borneo and Sumatra.

References

Batocerini
Beetles described in 1919